Banastre  may refer to:

 Banastre Maynard, 3rd Baron Maynard (c. 1642–1718), English politician
 Banastre Tarleton (1754–1833), British general and politician, noted for fighting in the American Revolutionary War
 Adam Banastre, English disaffected knight who led the 1315 Banastre Rebellion
 Alard Banastre, High Sheriff of Oxfordshire in 1174 and 1176
 Christopher Banastre, High Sheriff of Lancashire in 1670
 Thomas Banastre (c. 1334–1379), English knight and soldier
 Thomas Banastre (MP), MP for Lancashire (UK Parliament constituency) in 1314 
 William Banastre, English politician, MP for Lancashire in 1305
Banastre family who constructed Bank Hall in 1608 (family also known as 'Banastre de Banke')

English-language masculine given names